Manvinder Singh Bisla (born 27 December 1984) is an Indian cricketer. He is a wicket-keeper and right-handed batsman who currently plays for Goa. 
Bisla is one of the lesser known of the wicketkeeper batsman that Indian cricket unearthed from the junior and India-A ranks in the last decade, the others being Ajay Ratra, Parthiv Patel, M.S Dhoni and Dinesh Karthik. Bisla was the stand-in captain of the U-19 test team during their tour to England in 2002 season. The match ended in a draw.

Playing career

Bisla made his debut in Ranji Trophy domestic cricket in 2002 for his home state – Haryana. He moved to Himachal Pradesh in 2003/04 season and currently represents Goa in Indian domestic cricket, having joined them in 2012. He was part of the IPL-winning Deccan Chargers team in 2009, was picked by Kings XI Punjab in 2010. He made his debut in 2010.

In 2011 he was signed by the IPL franchise Kolkata Knight Riders. He played as the wicket keeper of KKR in first 5 matches as Brad Haddin was not available. He opened the batting with all rounder Jacques Kallis from South Africa and also made a partnership of 145 with Kallis. In IPL 2012, he played 7 matches and scored 213 runs with 1 half century in the final match of the tournament. He took 6 catches and 2 stumpings behind the stumps.

He played a match winning innings of 89 off 48 balls against the Chennai Super Kings in the final of the 2012 IPL to guide his team to a 5 wicket win. He received the Man of the Match award for this innings.

He was transferred from Kolkata Knight Riders to the Royal Challengers Bangalore for the 2015's edition of the Indian Premier League. He no longer plays the IPL. In October 2020, he was drafted by the Colombo Kings for the inaugural edition of the Lanka Premier League.

Personal life

Bisla was educated in D.A.V. Public School, sector 14, Faridabad, and married Arpita on 11 March 2007

Seasons by seasons at IPL

References

External links
 

Indian cricketers
Haryana cricketers
Himachal Pradesh cricketers
Punjab Kings cricketers
Kolkata Knight Riders cricketers
Jammu and Kashmir cricketers
Goa cricketers
North Zone cricketers
1984 births
Living people
People from Hisar (city)
Royal Challengers Bangalore cricketers
Abahani Limited cricketers
Cricketers from Haryana
Wicket-keepers